The Flamanville Nuclear Power Plant is located at Flamanville, Manche, France on the Cotentin Peninsula. The power plant houses two pressurized water reactors (PWRs) that produce 1.3 GWe each and came into service in 1986 and 1987, respectively. It produced 18.9 TWh in 2005, which amounted to 4% of the electricity production in France. In 2006 this figure was about 3.3%. At the time, there were 671 workers regularly working at the plant.

A third reactor at the site, an EPR unit, began construction in 2007 with its commercial introduction scheduled for 2012.  the project is more than five times over budget and years behind schedule. Various safety problems have been raised, including weakness in the steel used in the reactor. In July 2019, further delays were announced, pushing back the commercial introduction date to the end of 2022. In January 2022, more delays were announced, with fuel loading continuing until mid-2023, and again in December 2022, delaying fuel loading to early 2024.

Unit 3

Construction on a new reactor, Flamanville 3, began on 4 December 2007.  The new unit is an Areva European Pressurized Reactor type and is planned to have a nameplate capacity of 1,650 MWe. EDF estimated the cost at €3.3 billion and stated it would start commercial operations in 2012, after construction lasting 54 months. The latest cost estimate (July 2020) is at €19.1 billion, with commissioning planned tentatively at the end of 2022.

On 3 December 2012 EDF announced that the estimated costs have escalated to €8.5 billion ($11 billion), and the completion of construction was being delayed to 2016. The next day the Italian power company Enel announced it was relinquishing its 12.5% stake in the project, and five future EPRs. They would be reimbursed for their project stake of €613 million plus interest.

In November 2014 EDF announced that completion of construction was delayed to 2017 due to delays in component delivery by Areva.

In April 2015 Areva informed the French nuclear regulator, Autorité de sûreté nucléaire (ASN), that anomalies had been detected in the reactor vessel steel, causing "lower than expected mechanical toughness values". Segolene Royal, Minister of Ecology, Sustainable Development and Energy in the Second Valls Government, asked the producer for further details and possible consequences.

Various safety problems have been raised, including weakness in the steel used in the reactor together with heterogeneity of the steel alloy forged high integrity components used in the reactor pressure vessel, that have also been shown to be present in Japanese-sourced components that have entered the French nuclear equipment supply chain. The safety of the Flamanville EPR plant has also been questioned due to the danger of flooding of the kind experienced during the 1999 Blayais Nuclear Power Plant flood. In June 2015 multiple faults in cooling system safety valves were discovered by ASN.

In September 2015 EDF, announced that the estimated costs had escalated to €10.5 billion, and the start-up of the reactor was delayed to the fourth quarter of 2018. The delays of Unit 3 of Flamanville received additional attention when in December 2016 The Economist reported that the British loan guarantees for Hinkley Point C require Unit 3 to be operational by 2020, that the regulator will rule on the future of Unit 3 mid-2017 and that one possible outcome of this ruling can delay its opening far beyond 2018, thus jeopardizing the British loan guarantees thereby preventing EDF from building the EPRs at Hinkley Point.

In February 2017 renewed delays in the construction of the EPR-reactors at Taishan Nuclear Power Plant prompted EDF to state that Flamanville 3 remains on schedule to start operations by the end of 2018, assuming it receives regulator approval. In June 2017, the French regulator issued a provisional ruling that Flamanville 3 is safe to start.

In January 2018, cold functional tests were completed. In February, EDF found that some secondary cooling circuit welds did not meet specifications, causing EDF to carry out further checks and issue a report. Following this, ASN requested EDF to extend the welding checks to other systems. Hot functional tests had to be postponed.

In July 2018, EDF further delayed fuel loading to Q4 2019 and increased the project's cost estimate by a further €400 million ($467.1 million USD). The latest project cost estimates by EDF amounted to €10.9 billion ($12.75 billion USD), three times the original cost estimates. Hot testing was pushed back to the end of 2018. In January 2019, a further one-month delay in hot testing was announced.

In June 2019 the regulator ASN determined that eight welds in steam transfer pipes passing through the two-wall containment, that EDF had hoped to repair after startup, must be repaired before the reactor is commissioned. On 29 June 2019, it was announced that the start-up was once again being pushed back, making it unlikely it could be started before the end of 2022. It is estimated the repairs will add €1.5 billion to the costs, bringing the total to €12.4 billion. Further cost increases due to additional time needed to repair 110 defective welds have increased the cost to €12.7 billion.

In July 2020, the French Court of Audit finalised an eighteen-month in-depth analysis of the project, concluding that the total estimated cost reaches up to €19.1 billion. The severe delays incurred additional financing costs, as well as added taxes and levies. In a response, EDF did not dispute the findings of the court. In the same month, France's energy minister Barbara Pompili noted the high costs and delays, calling the project "a mess".

In December 2022, EDF announced a further delay of at least six months with an estimated cost increase of €500 million due to more work to establish a new process for the stress relieving heat treatment of some welds close to sensitive equipment. Fuel loading is now forecast for early 2024. Estimated total costs increased to €13.2 billion.

Incidents 
On 9 February 2017 a mechanical problem with a fan in the turbine hall of unit 1 caused an explosion and fire, causing five people to be treated for smoke inhalation. While the non-nuclear accident did not cause any radioactive leak, it did cause the number one reactor to be disconnected from the power grid. EDF initially estimated the reactor would be operational within a week, but later estimated the end of March.

Units 1 and 2 were under enhanced surveillance by regulator Autorité de sûreté nucléaire (ASN) from 2019 to 2022 because of shortcomings in some operating activities, a high number of maintenance faults, poor mastery of certain maintenance operations, and inadequate quality of the ten-year inspection documentation of unit 1. This involved about 30 ASN inspections a year.

References

Links

Nuclear power stations in France
Nuclear power stations with reactors under construction
Nuclear power stations using EPR reactors
Buildings and structures in Manche